Scratch the Surface is the third studio album by American hardcore band Sick of It All, released in 1994. It was the band's first major label recording on East West Records, their first venture away from an indie label.

Scratch the Surface became Sick of It All's most successful release and produced two singles: "Scratch the Surface" and "Step Down".

The album peaked at number 9 on the Billboard Heatseekers – Middle Atlantic chart and 121 on the UK Albums Chart.

Critical reception 
Decibel called the album a "hardcore magnum opus" and a "slab of extraordinarily lithe, stylized aggression". Trouser Press wrote: "As a blast of unreconstructed hardcore in a time and a place where such a thing was once impossible to imagine, Scratch the Surface makes Sick of It All's principled point loud if not clear."

Track listing 
 "No Cure"  – 2:58
 "Insurrection"  – 1:50
 "Consume"  – 3:42
 "Who Sets the Rules"  – 2:45
 "Goatless"  – 1:21
 "Step Down"  – 3:15
 "Maladjusted"  – 2:25
 "Scratch the Surface"  – 2:51
 "Free Spirit"  – 1:53
 "Force My Hand"  – 2:28
 "Desperate Fool"  – 1:52
 "Return to Reality"  – 2:43
 "Farm Team"  – 2:22
 "Cease Fire"  – 2:58

References 

1994 albums
East West Records albums
Albums produced by Billy Anderson (producer)
Sick of It All albums